The Hong Kong Polytechnic University (PolyU) is a public research university located in Hung Hom, Hong Kong. The University is one of the eight government-funded degree-granting tertiary institutions in Hong Kong. Founded in 1937 as the first Government Trade School, it is the first institution to provide technical education in Hong Kong. In 1994, the Legislative Council of Hong Kong passed a bill which granted the former Hong Kong Polytechnic official university status.

PolyU consists of 8 faculties and schools, offering programmes covering applied science, business, construction, environment, engineering, social science, health, humanities, design, hotel and tourism management. The university offers over 160 taught programmes for more than 25,800 students every year. It is the largest public tertiary institution in terms of number of students. 

As of 2022-23, PolyU ranks globally 79th by THE, 65th by QS, 100th in US News and 151~200th in ARWU. PolyU is among the top 10 young universities in the world as ranked by THE and QS. PolyU was 6th in the world's most international universities 2023 by THE.

History
In 1937, the Government Trade School was founded at Wood Road, Wan Chai. The school was the first publicly funded, post-secondary technical institution in Hong Kong. Under George White, the then principal, it ran classes in marine wireless operating, mechanical engineering and building construction. The campus was a three-storey high Victorian architecture, and commonly referred to the “Red Brick House” by the locals. After World War II, the Government Trade School became the Hong Kong Technical College in 1947, offering both full-time and part-time courses. In 1957, the new campus of the college located in Hung Hom was constructed. It was opened by Sir Alexander Grantham, the then Governor of Hong Kong.

In 1965, Sir Chung Sze-yuen (S.Y. Chung) suggested to establish a polytechnic in Hong Kong to provide post-secondary technical education. Dr Tang Ping-yuen was appointed by the government at the chair of the Polytechnic Planning Committee in May 1969. On 24 March 1972, the Legislative Council passed the Hong Kong Polytechnic Ordinance and the institute was established. Sir Chung assumed the first chair of the Polytechnic Board of Directors (later renamed Polytechnic Council in 1978). The Polytechnic's mandate was to provide professional-oriented education to meet the need for qualified workers. The institution launched its first five degree programmes in 1983, and introduced its first MPhil and PhD programmes in 1986 and 1989 respectively.

Present form
In 1994, the University gained approval from the University and Polytechnic Grants Committee (UPGC; now UGC) for self-accreditation of degree programmes, without the restrictions from the Post Secondary Colleges Ordinance . With that, the Institution assumed full university status on 25 November 1994, changing its name to “The Hong Kong Polytechnic University”.

Campuses

Main campus 

PolyU's main campus, in Hung Hom, Kowloon, was designed by a team led by James Kinoshita from P&T Group in 1972. It has over 20 buildings with red-brick walls, many of which are inter-connected and raised one floor above the podium, creating sheltered open-air spaces for multi-purposes such as logistics and parking. Apart from buildings named after donors, the rotundas which connects the buildings are identified in English letters (from cores and blocks A to Z, without K, O and I). It is one of the largest and densest educational campus in the world.

Block Z is the eighth phase of the campus expansion project. It is situated across the northwestern side of the main campus, separated by Chatham Road. It can be accessed through a pedestrian tunnel or a 80-meter-long footbridge, which was proposed in 2016 and built in 2019.

In addition to classrooms, laboratories and other academic facilities, the university provides a multi-purpose auditorium, recreational and catering facilities, medical facilities, as well as a bookstore and banks. The Jockey Club Auditorium began operation in 2000, its balcony and main floor seating accommodate up to 1,084 persons. It is specially designed as a multi-purpose venue for the hosting of conferences, seminars, ceremonies, corporate meetings, as well as the increasing number of cultural activities and performances, operas, chamber music, dramas, dances, film shows, variety shows, mini concerts etc.

There are multiple sports facilities, including two swimming pools (Block X and Michael Clinton Swimming Pool), 2 indoor sports grounds (Shaw Sports Complex and Kwong On Jubilee Sports Centre), an outdoor sports ground (Keith Legg Sports Field) with basketball and soccer fields and jogging track, 2 outdoor tennis courts, and a joint-sports centre.

Innovation Tower 

The Innovation Tower is located on the northwestern side of the university campus. This 15-story building provides 15,000 square meters of net floor area. It houses facilities for the School of Design, including exhibition areas, multi-functional classrooms and lecture theatres, design studios and workshops, as well as a communal lounge. The tower was designed by Zaha Hadid.

According to QS World University Rankings, PolyU school of design is ranked 20th globally in Art and Design

Teaching and research hotel 

The Hotel Icon was officially opened on 21 September 2011. The hotel is wholly owned by the university as a teaching and research hotel of the School of Hotel and Tourism Management (SHTM). 

SHTM has consistently been ranked among the top hotel and tourism management schools in the world.

Hung Hom Bay and West Kowloon Campus
Hung Hom Bay Campus and West Kowloon Campus are the two satellite campuses which host the College of Professional and Continuing Education. The College is formed by two subsidiaries, the Hong Kong Community College (HKCC) and School of Professional Education and Executive Development (SPEED).

Established in 2001 under the auspices of PolyU, HKCC is a self-financed post-secondary institution which offers associate degree and higher diploma programmes spanning the domains of arts, science, social sciences, business, health care and design for senior secondary school leavers. HKCC classes are conducted at the Hung Hom Bay and West Kowloon.

Academics 

As of 2020, the university had 915 sub-degree students, 14,961 undergraduate students and 10,369 postgraduate students. Higher diploma, Bachelor's degrees with honours and all postgraduate programmes, in a total of over 150 are offered through 8 faculties, and schools, including Faculty of Applied Science and Textiles, Faculty of Business, Faculty of Construction and Environment, Faculty of Engineering, Faculty of Health and Social Sciences, Faculty of Humanities, School of Design and School of Hotel and Tourism Management.

PolyU Graduate School, established in September 2020, oversees the administration of research postgraduate education of the university, though the academic supervision of students is still managed by the respective faculties, schools or department.

The College of Professional and Continuing Education (CPEC), founded in 2002, is a subsidiary of the university. As of 2019, the college had 13,032 students. It is formed by Hong Kong Community College (HKCC) and School of Professional Education and Executive Development (SPEED), both of which offer self-financed degree programmes and sub-degrees programmes in the name of the college.

Notable academics
As of 2020, PolyU employed 1,182 academic faculty members and 1,504 research staff, with additional staff at the CPEC. The faculty includes scholars such as Swedish systemic functional linguist C.M.I.M. Matthiessen, electrical and electronic engineer Philip Chan, mechanical engineer Timothy W. Tong. Some politicians in Hong Kong serve as faculty in PolyU, including current or former member of the Legislative Council Fernando Cheung, Lau Siu-lai, Helena Wong and Cheng Chung-tai.

Research
PolyU's research focus areas include: aerospace, aviation, big data and AI, food safety, health science, infrastructure monitoring, intelligent construction, sustainability and smart city. To facilitate the implementation of cross-disciplinary research through collaborations among faculties and schools and other local and overseas institutions and partners, PolyU established a wide variety of research laboratories, institutes and centres, for instance, the Aviation Services Research Centre with Boeing.

The Hong Kong Research Institute of Textiles and Apparel established by PolyU in 2006 acts as a focal point to enhance technological innovation in textiles and apparel industry for the development of highly competitive industrial clusters in Hong Kong.

Pao Yue-kong Library

The PolyU Library was established on 1 August 1972. Two centres operated in Hung Hom and Quarry Bay until 1976, when they eventually merged into the present building. It was named after shipping entrepreneur and philanthropist Yue-Kong Pao in 1995.

In 2014, there were over 2.77 million of library holdings in total, with nearly 600,000 electronic resources. The six-storey library provides 3,900 study spaces and is equipped with a 24-hour study centre and audio-visual information areas. In 2017, the 3/F and 4/F of the library was transformed into the "i-space" which contains services such as VR Experience Zone, Internet of Things (IoT), Laser Cutting / Engraving, 3D Scanning, Book Scanning, Large Format Printing, Vinyl Cutting and 3D Printing. Video production facilities such as the One button studio and Digital Studio are also available on the 3/F.

Rankings and reputation

Overall Rankings 
PolyU ranked 65th worldwide in the QS World University Rankings 2023, 79th worldwide in the Times Higher Education (THE) World University Rankings 2023, 100th worldwide in the US News 2022-2023 Best Global Universities Rankings, and 151-200th worldwide in ARWU 2022. 

The Aggregate Ranking of Top Universities (ARTU), which sorts universities based on their aggregate performance across THE, QS, and ARWU, ranked PolyU 94th worldwide in 2022. 

PolyU was named the 6th most international university in the world in 2023 by THE.

Young University Rankings 
In the QS "Top 50 Under 50" list of world's top young universities (2021), PolyU ranked 6th in the world, 3rd in Hong Kong. Times Higher Education's Young University Rankings 2022 ranked PolyU 5th in the world, 2nd in Hong Kong.

Subjects / Areas Rankings

QS Subject Rankings 
In the QS World University Rankings by Subject 2022: 

In the QS World University Rankings by Broad Subject Area 2022:

THE Subject Rankings 
In the Times Higher Education World University Rankings by Subjects (2023):

Other subject rankings 
The Faculty of Business is ranked 1st in shipping research in the world, based on 2016 to 2018 data from Thomson Reuters' ISI Web of Science. 55th in the Top 100 World Rankings of Business Schools by University of Texas at Dallas, based on research contributions to 24 leading business journals from 2012 to 2016.

The School of Design is among top 3 design schools in Greater China, according to Business Week (Oct 2009 issue) and top 25 design schools in the world and is the only selected design school in Asia, according to Business Insider magazine (Dec 2012 issue).

The School of Hotel and Tourism Management (SHTM) is ranked 1st in the subject of hospitality and tourism management by the ShanghaiRanking's Global Ranking of Academic Subjects 2020, 1st in the category of commerce, management, tourism and services, University Ranking by Academic Performance (URAP) 2019/20,  and 2nd in research and scholarly activities among institutions specializing in hospitality and tourism, according to the World Ranking of Top 100 Hospitality and Tourism Programs by Journal of Hospitality & Tourism Research (Nov 2009 issue).

Graduate employability rankings 
PolyU graduates ranked 71st worldwide in the QS Graduate Employability Rankings 2022  and 133rd worldwide in the Times Higher Education's Global University Employability Ranking 2022.

According to the "Opinion Survey on the Public Ranking of Universities in Hong Kong" conducted by HKUPOP (now HKPORI), PolyU graduates ranked as the 3rd (in 2017), 2nd (in 2016), and 4th (in 2015 and in 2014) most preferred university graduates by local employers in Hong Kong.

Governance 
The governing body of the PolyU is the Council, established in accordance with the PolyU Ordinance. The President and the Deputy President are ex officio members. There are also 17 external members from the business and professional sectors, three elected staff members, one alumni member and two elected student members.The highest advisory body of the Council is the University Court, which is responsible for providing opinions on the direction of the university to promote the development of the university.

Presidents
List of presidents of PolyU and their predecessors (known as the director of the Hong Kong Polytechnic before 1994):

 Keith Legg (1972–1985)
John Clark (1985–1991)
Poon Chung-kwong (25 November 1991 – 31 December 2008)
Timothy W. Tong (1 January 2009 – 31 December 2018)
Philip C. H. Chan (1 January 2019 – 30 June 2019)
Teng Jin-guang (1 July 2019 – present)

Cooperation
The PolyU has established cooperative relations with more than 280 universities or institutions in 39 countries and regions around the world, and signed about 445 agreements in the areas of student exchange arrangements to joint research cooperation.

Student life

Student organization 

The Hong Kong Polytechnic University Students’ Union (HKPUSU) is a student-run organization that is autonomous from the University administration for promoting the interests and welfare of full-time undergraduates (excluding postgraduate and College of Professional and Continuing Education students).

Sports teams 

 Athletics
 Badminton
 Basketball
 Fencing
 Handball
 Karate-do
 Rowing
 Rugby
 Soccer
 Squash
 Swimming
 Table Tennis
 Taekwondo
 Tennis
 Volleyball
 Woodball

Student halls 

There are two student halls of residence buildings provided by the university, in Hung Hom Bay and Ho Man Tin. The residential halls include:

 Hung Hom Bay – Research Postgraduate: Boyan Hall (19,20/F). Undergraduates: Kaiyuan Hall (17,18/F), Wuhua Hall (15,16/F), Chengde Hall (13,14/F), Wuxian Hall (11,12/F), Lizhi Hall (9,10/F), Lisheng Hall (5,6/F), Minyin Hall (3,4/F). Female residents: Xuemin Hall (7,8/F).
 Ho Man Tin – Co-ed halls for both all students: 3-7/F (Purple), 5-9/F (Blue), 10-14/F (Green), 12-16/F (Yellow), 17-21/F (Orange), 19-23/F (Red), 24-25/F is warden's floor.

The university also provides three off-campus housing sites, located in Sham Shui Po, Mong Kok, and Tsim Sha Tsui. It offers around 250 residential places at urban areas, as an accommodation option for non-local students.

Incidents

Democracy wall controversy 
The university's faculty-led Student Discipline Committee, with the support of the university council chairman Lam Tai-fai, expelled one student and suspended another for one year in response to an October 2018 incident arising from a dispute over postings by students on the "Democracy Wall" bulletin board then managed by the students' union. The students had posted messages in commemoration of the fourth anniversary of the "Umbrella Movement" democracy occupation protests of 2014 and calling for Hong Kong independence from the CCP-ruled People's Republic of China. Another two students were ordered to serve terms of community service. The students had been ordered by management to take them down.

The evidence called at the disciplinary committee hearing, at which the students were denied legal representation, included video footage in which the students were observed shouting and knocking on doors. It was alleged that they had made defamatory comments, assaulted a staff member and damaged property, all of which accusations were denied by the students. The university described their behaviour as "unruly". Among them were a former student union leader, an elected member of the school's governing council and a former external vice-president of the student union. No avenue for appeal from a decision of the committee is available.

Numerous pro-democracy groups, including more than a dozen legislators and 19 student organisations, protested the decision of the committee. The 90,000-strong Hong Kong Professional Teachers' Union described the punishments as excessive.

2019 campus siege 

In November 2019, the university was occupied by protesters as part of the 2019–20 Hong Kong protests; confrontation with the Hong Kong Police Force occurred from 17 November to 19 November. On 16 November, police attempted to enter the campus, but failed as protestors barricaded the entrance and used petrol bombs to attack them. The police then blocked all exits of the university campus and requested all protesters inside to surrender. On 18 November, the police attempted to enter the campus again using tear gas, rubber bullets, bean bags, and sponge grenades. Protestors responded by throwing petrol bombs at police. The university has been described as being a battleground during the conflict. The university was later sealed off by police, only several protesters managed to escape. This resulted in a 3-days long standoff. More than 280 protesters were injured while more than 1,000 persons were arrested.

Notable alumni

Notable alumni of PolyU included Chinese Premier Li Qiang, former Chief Executive of Hong Kong Leung Chun-ying, former Hong Kong Legislator Lam Tai-fai and Chan Kam-lam, explorer Rebecca Lee, film director Wong Kar-wai and Raman Hui, musician Paul Wong, singer Gigi Leung, fashion designer Vivienne Tam and software engineer Lui Kim-man.

Gallery

Notes

References

Bibliography 

 Waters, D. D., A brief history of technical education in Hong Kong - with special reference to the Polytechnic University (2002).

External links 

 

 
Educational institutions established in 1937
1937 establishments in Hong Kong